Prabin Tuladhar is a Nepalese boxer. He competed in the men's flyweight event at the 1984 Summer Olympics. At the 1984 Summer Olympics, he lost to Peter Ayesu of Malawi.

References

Year of birth missing (living people)
Living people
Nepalese male boxers
Olympic boxers of Nepal
Boxers at the 1984 Summer Olympics
Place of birth missing (living people)
Flyweight boxers